Wotton railway station may refer to the following former stations in Wotton, Buckinghamshire, England:

 Wotton railway station (Brill Tramway)
 Wotton railway station (Great Central Railway)